The Gippsland Football League(GFL) is an Australian rules football competition played in Gippsland, Victoria, Australia.

History

The Gippsland Football League was formed when the Northern Gippsland Football Association (NGFA) officially changed their name to "The Gippsland Football League" in 1921.

The R. Frank Jensen Trophy, was initially awarded to the best and fairest player in the Gippsland Football League in 1927 and was named after the donor. Then T. Victor Trood donated the award from 1928 onwards. Trood, originally from Sale, was a former VFL player with University former Sale FC footballer and Sale FC delegate, who went onto become the GFL President (1933 & 1936 to 1938) and a life member.

The Rodda Medal was initially awarded to the best and fairest winner in the Central Gippsland Football Association in 1936, after Morwell player, Fred Rodda suffered fatal injuries in a match in 1936.

In 1944 and 1945, there was a Central Gippsland Wartime Football League and the Rex Hartley Memorial Medal was first presented to the best and fairest player. This competition only went for two years and this award continued on with Central Gippsland FL Reserves competition from 1946 to 1953. The Gippsland FL then continued this Reserves award from 1954 to present day.

Both the Trood Award and the Rodda Medal were continued on in the newly formed La Trobe Valley Football League in 1954, as the senior football best and fairest trophy, after the Central Gippsland Football League folded, when seven clubs joined the new La Trobe Valley Football League.

25 of the winners below, played senior VFL / AFL football either before or after winning this most prestigious football award.

The following list represents the best and fairest winners in all grades of football since 1927.

Best and Fairest Lists
Trood Award / Rodda Medal

Rodda Medal

Central Gippsland Football League (1909 to 1953)
Senior & Reserves Football Best and Fairest Awards
The Central Gippsland Football Association was initially formed in 1909 from the following club's - Bunyip, Drouin, Moe, Morwell, Thorpedale, Trafalgar, Traralgon and Yarragon.

A gold medal was first awarded in 1932, when the Elder-Berwick medal was presented to the CGFL best and fairest player. Mr. George Elder-Berwick was a Morwell FC Delegate and later a CGFL President in 1934 who donated the gold medal.

The Rodda Medal was initially awarded to the best and fairest winner in the Central Gippsland Football Association in 1936, after Morwell player, Fred Rodda suffered fatal injuries in a match in 1936.

In 1944 and 1945, there was a Central Gippsland Wartime Football League and the Rex Hartley Memorial Medal was first presented to the best and fairest player. Hartley was a former Moe FC player. This competition only went for two years and this award continued on with Gippsland FL Reserves competition from 1946 onwards.

Both the Trood Award and the Rodda Medal were continued on in the newly formed La Trobe Valley Football League in 1954, as the senior football best and fairest trophy, along with the Rex Hartley (Reserves) Medal after the Central Gippsland Football League folded, when seven clubs joined the new La Trobe Valley Football League.

10 of the medal winners below, played senior VFL / AFL football either before or after winning this most prestigious football award.

Notes
 - 1950: Morwell Reserves were undefeated in 1950.

Sources

External links
Gippsland Football League
Gippsland FL Premiership Lists
1927 - Warragul FC & Yallourn FC team photos
2019 - GFL Annual Report Annual Report has a full list of football & netball B&F winners
1931 - Gippsland FL v Central Gippsland FL: team photos
1932 - Trafalgar FC & Warragul FC team photos
1951 - Central Gippsland FL Schoolboys team photo
1952 - Central Gippsland FL Premiers: Morwell FC team photo

Best and fairest
Australian rules football-related lists